Even the Clouds Are Drifting is a 1959 South Korean drama film directed by Yu Hyun-mok. It was entered into the 10th Berlin International Film Festival.

Cast
 Kim Young-ok
 Um Aing-ran
 Park Sung-dae
 Do Kum-bong
 Choi Moo-ryong

References

External links

1959 films
South Korean drama films
1950s Korean-language films
1959 drama films
South Korean black-and-white films
Films directed by Yu Hyun-mok